Meina is a comune (municipality) in the Province of Novara in the Italian region of Piedmont, located about  northwest of Milan, about  northeast of Turin and about  north of Novara, on the southern area of Lake Maggiore.

During World War II, Meina was the site of the massacre of 16 Italian Jews by German SS soldiers as part of the Lake Maggiore massacres. The event inspired the movie Hotel Meina, directed in 2007 by Carlo Lizzani.

References

External links
Official Tourism Gateway Lake Maggiore Official Tourism Gateway
Ofer Lellouche

Cities and towns in Piedmont